Alexandra Chong is a Jamaican entrepreneur. She is the founder and CEO of Jacana, a global cannabis company. Jacana cultivates, develops and distributes medical cannabis internationally and in a historic move, it was the first company to export Jamaican medical cannabis flower internationally. 

She was previously the founder and CEO of Lulu, a mobile app for dating intelligence. Business Insider and AdWeek have recognized her as one of the top entrepreneurs in New York. She launched Luluvise in 2011 and Lulu was released in the US by 2013. It was nominated as TechCrunch'''s 2013 "Fastest Rising Startup". Lulu was acquired in 2016 by Badoo.

Chong was born in Jamaica to a Canadian mother and Chinese-Jamaican father, who won the lottery and started a successful tourism company with the money. She grew up in Ocho Rios. In the 1990s, she played tennis in the women-only Federation Cup. She attended Florida International University on a sports scholarship, and Florida was one of the main sites for Lulu's launch in the US. She is a former member of the Jamaica Fed Cup tennis team and has a law degree from the London School of Economics.

After graduation, she worked in the legal department of a music licensing start-up. Before founding Lulu, Chong had a position in Upstream, a London-based mobile marketing firm.

Lulu has been covered by the New York Times, which wrote that Chong started a "take back the internet movement for young women". Her idea to bring the reputation economy into the world of online dating also gained coverage fromby international media, including People, TechCrunch, Fox News, CNN Money, The New Yorker,  The Next Web and Wired UK''.

In February 2016, it was reported that Lulu had been bought by Badoo, which is the biggest dating company in the world. Chong had known Badoo's CEO, Andrey Andreev, since 2011, which is before Lulu had launched. Chong became Badoo's president as part of the deal and moved back to London. She left Badoo in July 2016.

Personal life
Chong married Jack Brockway, the nephew of the British businessman Richard Branson, in June 2015 in Jamaica. Brockway is the brother of Ned Rocknroll.

References

Women chief executives
Year of birth missing (living people)
Living people
Alumni of the London School of Economics
Jamaican people of Chinese descent
Jamaican people of Canadian descent
Jamaican female tennis players
Jamaican expatriates in England
Jamaican businesspeople
Chief executives in the technology industry
Technology company founders